The Diocese of Trenton is a Latin Church ecclesiastical territory or diocese of the Catholic Church that encompasses Burlington, Mercer, Monmouth, and Ocean counties in central New Jersey. The Diocese of Trenton is a suffragan diocese in the ecclesiastical province of the metropolitan Archdiocese of Newark.

History

Initial Catholic presence
The Catholic Church in what is now the diocese dates back more than 250 years. Jesuit Father Joseph Greaton arrived in Philadelphia in 1729 and built Old St. Joseph's Church, on Willings Alley at Fourth St. About 1732, he took charge of the West Jersey mission territory extending from Trenton to Cape May.

A few years later, visits to the widely scattered Catholic families were recorded by Father Theodore Schneider, another Jesuit, who visited the iron furnaces in the southern part of the state in 1744. Traveling on horseback, by stagecoach, and riverboat, he covered all of south and central Jersey as well as parts of eastern Pennsylvania and Delaware.

When Schneider died in 1764, Father Ferdinand Steinmeyer, another Jesuit, succeeded him. Also known as Father Ferdinand Farmer, he traversed the state from Philadelphia to New York twice yearly visiting scattered Catholic families. He continued the ministry until his death in 1786.

When Pope Pius VII erected the Diocese of New York and the Diocese of Philadelphia on 8 April 1808, he split the state of New Jersey between them, assigning Sussex, Bergen, Morris, Essex, Somerset, Middlesex, and Monmouth counties in northeastern New Jersey to the Diocese of New York and the rest of the state to the Diocese of Philadelphia. But when Pope Pius IX erected the Diocese of Newark in 1853, he reunited the state of New Jersey as its initial territory.

First parish
Records show that mass was celebrated in the printing office of Isaac Collins at Queen and Second Streets (now State and Broad Streets) in the heart of the Trenton business district starting around 1804. From 1811 to 1814, Mass was celebrated in the Federal St. home of John Baptist Sartori, a consular official who represented the commercial interests of the Papal States in Italy. When the number of Catholics coming to Mass became too much for the Sartori residence, Sartori and John Hargous purchased a plot of land at Lamberton and Market Streets with the encouragement of Michael Egan, the first bishop of Philadelphia, where they built a small brick church dedicated to St. John the Evangelist in 1814. The congregation was the first Catholic parish in the state.

Some time later, a new parish church was built on South Broad Street. Following a devastating fire in 1883, another new church was erected and dedicated to the Sacred Heart. As the population of Trenton grew, new churches were built in Bordentown and Lambertville. In the 1860s, Father Anthony Smith saw the need for a new parish in the northern section of the city and, in 1865, purchased land where the Cathedral of St. Mary of the Assumption now stands. The site of the cathedral is the place where Col. Johann Gottlieb Rall, commander of the Hessian troops, had his headquarters during the Battle of Trenton in December 1776. Construction of the church began with breaking ground on 23 April 1866, and Bishop James Roosevelt Bayley of Newark dedicated it on the Sunday of 1 January 1871.

Erection of the diocese
The Catholic population of New Jersey grew rapidly, from 25,000 in 1860 to 130,000 in 1880. In 1881, Pope Leo XIII erected the Diocese of Trenton, taking the southern part of New Jersey from the Diocese of Newark, to serve the Catholics of the southern part of the state, designating the Church of St. Mary of the Assumption as its cathedral, and appointing Father Michael J. O'Farrell of New York as its first bishop. At the time, the diocese had 68 churches, 23 parochial schools, and 51 priests.

New Jersey's Catholic population continued to grow with immigration from Italy and eastern Europe. Catholic Charities of the Diocese of Trenton was founded in 1913. In 1937, Pope Pius XI erected the Diocese of Camden, taking its territory, the six counties in the southern part of the state, from the Diocese of Trenton and appointing Bishop Bartholomew Eustace. The remaining Diocese of Trenton had a Catholic population of 210,114 in eight counties with 212 diocesan priests, 121 parishes and 70 parochial schools.

Much of the growth of the Catholic population in the Diocese of Trenton took place during the episcopacy of Bishop George W. Ahr, from 1952 to his retirement on 23 June 1979. The Catholic population grew to more than 800,000 during this time. Ahr established more than 50 new parishes and blessed more than 250 new buildings, including 100 new churches and parish centers and 90 schools and school additions.

On 14 March 1956, in the midst of the tremendous growth, tragedy struck when fire destroyed St. Mary's Cathedral, claiming the lives of the rector, Msgr. Richard T. Crean, and two housekeepers.

As the diocese that was growing and the world was changing, Bishop Ahr took part in all four sessions of the Second Vatican Council, 1962–1965, and subsequently guided implementation of the council's decrees in the diocese.

On 22 April 1980, John C. Reiss, who had been an auxiliary bishop of the diocese since 1967, succeeded Ahr. At this point, the diocese had a Catholic population of about 850,000.

Just a few months later, Pope John Paul II erected the Diocese of Metuchen, taking Middlesex, Somerset, Hunterdon and Warren counties from the Diocese of Trenton on 24 November 1980. This reduced the Diocese of Trenton to its present territory, with 447,915 parishioners in 119 parishes served by 193 diocesan priests and 105 religious priests.

Preparing for a new millennium
Bishop Reiss led the celebration of the diocesan centennial in August 1981.
After initiating the Emmaus program of priestly spirituality in 1982, Reiss implemented the Renew process for lay spirituality, which was intended to bring parishioners together in small faith-sharing groups in five seasons from 1985 through 1987.

In 1986, Reiss approved a new vicariate structure for administration of the diocese. On 13 January 1991, he opened the Fourth Diocesan Synod during a Mass in St. Mary's Cathedral, 60 years after the Third Synod. In 1982, Pope John Paul II appointed Msgr. Edward U. Kmiec, who had been master of ceremonies and secretary for Bishop Ahr and later for Bishop Reiss, to the office of Auxiliary Bishop of Trenton. Ten years later, the same pope appointed Bishop Kmiec to the office of Bishop of Nashville.

On 30 June 1992, Reiss launched Faith-In-Service, a diocesan capital and endowment fund campaign, to try to ensure the financial stability of diocesan services. The campaign had a goal of $32 million and raised more than $38 million in gifts and pledges.

On 21 November 1995, Pope John Paul II appointed John M. Smith to the office of Coadjutor Bishop of Trenton, to eventually succeed Reiss as bishop of the diocese. Smith, a native and former auxiliary bishop of the Archdiocese of Newark who was then Bishop of Pensacola-Tallahassee. Reiss submitted his resignation to Pope John Paul II upon reaching the age of 75, as required by canon law. The pope accepted the resignation as of July 1, 1997, whereupon Smith succeeded to the office of Bishop of Trenton.

Into the new millennium

In his 13 years leading the Diocese of Trenton, Bishop John M. Smith is responsible for fostering numerous initiatives that have served the people of the diocese and beyond.

Following the call of Pope John Paul II to place ever-advancing communications technologies at the service of the Gospel, Bishop Smith oversaw the diocese's establishment of an Internet presence with the launch of the diocesan website (www.dioceseoftrenton.org) in 2000. He also championed the diocese's newly created teen talk show, Realfaith TV, which is televised and webcast throughout North America and has garnered numerous prestigious awards.

That online presence has grown significantly in the decade that followed, with specially targeted websites for the diocese's Hispanic Apostolate; Ministry of Vocations; the sanctity of human life with (www.respectlifetoday.com) and, most recently, The Monitor online (www.TrentonMonitor.com).

Bishop Smith has also shepherded the diocese toward new ways to be Church in response to new and changing realities. As part of the call to empower the laity and prepare lay men and women for ministry in the diocese, Bishop Smith created the Institute for Lay Ecclesial Ministry, which has formed and commissioned 110 individuals to date.

In order that parishes might be more effective and engaging in their ministry and outreach to their parishioners and the wider community, particularly in response to population changes and a declining number of priests, Bishop Smith set forth "The 11 Elements of a Vibrant Parish" in 2000 and launched a consultative study process in the years that followed in support of those ideals. The study gave rise to parish restructuring that reduced the number of parishes to 111 to date, and pointed to areas of interparochial cooperation and collaboration to enhance their ability to serve the shared needs of their people.

With declining enrollment in some Catholic schools, Bishop Smith also called for a strategic planning process to determine the best ways to preserve Catholic education in the diocese for generations to come. In January 2006, Bishop Smith announced the "Commitment to Excellence" initiative and action plan that enumerated new measures in school leadership, marketing and financial management, and benchmarks that schools needed to achieve in enrollment, class size and curriculum development. Although many schools were still thriving and operating on a waiting list, his mission to suburbanize the Diocese of Trenton remained undeterred. Bishop Smith effectively closed every Catholic school in Trenton to the detriment of the community, Catholic education and, the city of Trenton.

In August 2009, Bishop Smith officially inaugurated and promulgated a new diocesan pastoral plan, "Led By the Spirit," the result of nearly two years of consultation with Catholics throughout the diocese. The plan identifies seven pastoral priorities—dealing with charity and justice, pastoral leadership, ethnic diversity, youth and young adult ministry, faith formation and Sunday worship - and resulted in a restructuring of the diocesan administrative structure that better supports the priorities. Since the promulgation, all parishes have been engaged in developing action plans in service to "Led By the Spirit."

On June 4, 2010, Pope Benedict XVI named Vincentian Father David M. O'Connell, C.M., president of The Catholic University of America, Washington, D.C. as Coadjutor Bishop of Trenton. He received episcopal ordination on the following 30 July from Bishop John M. Smith, the diocesan bishop in St. Mary of the Assumption Cathedral, Trenton. As required by Church law, Bishop John M. Smith submitted his resignation to the Holy See on June 23, his 75th birthday. Bishop O'Connell succeeded to the diocese on Dec. 1, 2010, when Pope Benedict XVI accepted Bishop John M. Smith's resignation.

After the completion of the construction of the Church of St. Robert Bellarmine in the township of Freehold, New Jersey in 2002, the diocese began using this church for diocesan functions because it offered a more central location in the diocese than the cathedral. This use expanded to the point that Bishop David M. O'Connell petitioned the Vatican to elevate this church to a co-cathedral on 11 April 2016. The Congregation for Bishops granted approval on 3 December of that year, and the official elevation occurred on 19 February 2017.

Sexual abuse
On February 13, 2019, all of the Catholic dioceses based in New Jersey released the names of clergy who had been credibly accused of sexually abusing children since 1940. Of the 188 listed, 30 were based in the Diocese of Trenton. Newark Archbishop Cardinal Joseph Tobin, who leads the Ecclesiastical province that encompasses the Diocese of Trenton stated also that the names listed were previously reported to law enforcement agencies. By 2020, the names of 43 accused clergy who served in the Diocese of Trenton were made public.

On February 9, 2020, it was reported that all five Catholic dioceses across the state of New Jersey, including the Diocese of Trenton, had paid over $11 million to compensate 105 claims of sex abuse committed by Catholic clergy. Of these 105 claims, 98 were compensated through settlements. The same month, it was also revealed that since 2005, the Diocese of Trenton worked with the Archdiocese of Newark and Diocese of Metuchen in a compensation plan which involved paying victims of former cardinal, Archbishop of Newark, and Bishop of Metuchen Theodore McCarrick.

Present day
The Diocese of Trenton comprises the counties of Burlington, Mercer, Monmouth and Ocean. As of 2021, it serves a population of 774,000 in 107 parishes.

Bishops
The following is a list of Bishops of Trenton and their years of service:

Bishops of Trenton
 Michael J. O'Farrell (1881–1894)
 James A. McFaul (1894–1917)
 Thomas J. Walsh (1917–1928), appointed Bishop and later Archbishop of Newark
 John J. McMahon (1928–1932)
 Moses E. Kiley (1934–1940), appointed Archbishop of Milwaukee
 William A. Griffin (1940–1950)
 George W. Ahr (1950–1979)
 John C. Reiss (1980–1997)
 John M. Smith (1997–2010; coadjutor bishop 1995–1997)
 David M. O'Connell, C.M. (2010–present; coadjutor bishop 2010)

Former auxiliary bishops
 James John Hogan (1959–1966), appointed Bishop of Altoona-Johnstown
 John C. Reiss (1967–1980), appointed Bishop of Trenton
 Edward Kmiec (1982–1992), appointed Bishop of Nashville

Education

High schools
 Christian Brothers Academy*, Lincroft
 Donovan Catholic High School, Toms River (known as St. Joseph High School until 1983 and Monsignor Donovan High School until 2014)
 Holy Cross Academy, Delran
 Mater Dei Prep*, Middletown
 Notre Dame High School, Lawrenceville
 Red Bank Catholic High School, Red Bank
 St. John Vianney High School, Holmdel
 St. Rose High School, Belmar
 Stuart Country Day School of the Sacred Heart*, Princeton
 Trenton Catholic Academy, Hamilton
 Trinity Hall*, Tinton Falls
 Villa Victoria Academy*, Ewing Township
 *Operates independently with the concurrence of the Diocese.

Ecclesiastical province

See also
John Joseph Cardinal Carberry (secretary to Bishop Moses E. Kiley)
List of the Catholic cathedrals of the United States
List of the Catholic dioceses of the United States
Plenary Councils of Baltimore
Roman Catholicism in the United States
Catholicism and American politics
History of Roman Catholicism in the United States

References

External links

Roman Catholic Diocese of Trenton Official Site
New Jersey Provincial Directory

 
Trenton, New Jersey
Trenton
Trenton
Trenton
1881 establishments in New Jersey